The 2014 Skycity Triple Crown was a motor race meeting for the Australian sedan-based V8 Supercars. It was the sixth event of the 2014 International V8 Supercars Championship. It was held on the weekend of 20–22 June at the Hidden Valley Raceway, near Darwin, Northern Territory.

References 

Darwin
June 2014 sports events in Australia
Sport in Darwin, Northern Territory
2010s in the Northern Territory
Motorsport in the Northern Territory